The 1994 Comcast U.S. Indoor was a men's tennis tournament played on indoor carpet courts that was part of the Championship Series of the 1994 ATP Tour. It was the 27th edition of the tournament and was played at the Spectrum in Philadelphia, Pennsylvania in the United States from February 14 to February 21, 1994. Third-seeded Michael Chang won the singles title.

Finals

Singles

 Michael Chang defeated  Paul Haarhuis 6–3, 6–2
 It was Chang's 2nd singles title of the year and the 15th of his career.

Doubles

 Jacco Eltingh /  Paul Haarhuis defeated  Jim Grabb /  Jared Palmer 6–3, 6–4
 It was Eltingh's 2nd title of the year and the 16th of his career. It was Haarhuis' 2nd title of the year and the 15th of his career.

References

External links
 ITF tournament edition edition

Comcast U.S. Indoor
U.S. Pro Indoor
Comcast U.S.
Comcast U.S.
Comcast U.S.